Rita Shugart (née Kennedy) is an American bridge player.

Shugart won her first national title in 1998.

She won the Reisinger, arguably the most difficult of all the North American Bridge Championships to win, in consecutive years, 1998, 1999, playing four handed.  Shugart is the only female to win the event in over 60 years.

Bridge accomplishments

Wins

 North American Bridge Championships (3)
 Mitchell Board-a-Match Teams (1) 1999 
 Reisinger (2) 1998, 1999

Runners-up

 North American Bridge Championships
 Chicago Mixed Board-a-Match (1) 1998

References

External links
 

American contract bridge players
Living people
Year of birth missing (living people)
Place of birth missing (living people)